Horodyshche is a city located in Cherkasy Raion of Cherkasy Oblast (province) in central Ukraine. It hosts the administration of Horodyshche urban hromada, one of the hromadas of Ukraine. The city rests on the Vilshanka River. Population:

History
A local newspaper is published here since 1930.

It was occupied by German forces during World War II in the summer of 1941 until 1944.

City since 1956.

In January 1989 the population of the city was 17 109 people

In January 2013 the population of the city was 14 291 people

Until 18 July 2020, Horodyshche served as an administrative center of Horodyshche Raion. The raion was abolished in July 2020 as part of the administrative reform of Ukraine, which reduced the number of raions of Cherkasy Oblast to four. The area of Horodyshche Raion was split between Cherkasy and Zvenyhorodka Raions, with Horodyshche being transferred to Cherkasy Raion.

Horodyshche was the birthplace of Semen Hulak-Artemovsky, a singer and composer of Ukrainian opera; there is a museum in Horodyshche dedicated to his life and work.

The famous Jewish sociologist and journalist Jacob Lestschinsky (1876-1966) was born in Horodyshche.

References

 Історіа міст і сіл Української CCP - Черкаська область (History of Towns and Villages of the Ukrainian SSR - Cherkasy Oblast). Kiev, 1972
 site of the Horodyshchensky Raion
 site of the Horodyshche

Cities in Cherkasy Oblast
Cities of district significance in Ukraine
Kiev Governorate
Holocaust locations in Ukraine